Yellow Star (German: Gelbstern) is a 1922 German silent drama film directed by Wolfgang Neff and starring Uschi Elleot, Robert Scholz and Fritz Kampers.

Cast
 Uschi Elleot as Konfektioneuse 
 Loo Hardy
 Robert Scholz as Charles Beulancon 
 Margarete Schaup
 Frederic Brunn
 Walter Liedtke
 Rudolf Hilberg
 Fritz Kampers

References

Bibliography
 Grange, William. Cultural Chronicle of the Weimar Republic. Scarecrow Press, 2008.

External links

1922 films
Films of the Weimar Republic
Films directed by Wolfgang Neff
German silent feature films
German black-and-white films
German drama films
1922 drama films
Silent drama films
1920s German films